Eduardo González may refer to:

 Eduardo González (politician) (born 1969), member of the Florida House of Representatives
 Eduardo Gonzalez (archer) (born 1984), Venezuelan compound archer
 Eduardo González (swimmer) (born 1974), Puerto Rican swimmer
 Chato González (born 1944), Spanish footballer and manager
 Eduardo González Valiño (1911–1979), Spanish footballer
 Eduardo González Salvador (born 1960), Spanish racing cyclist